Thailand competed at the 2016 Summer Olympics in Rio de Janeiro, Brazil, from 5 to 21 August 2016. Since the nation's official debut in 1952, Thai athletes had appeared in every edition of the Summer Olympic Games, with the exception of the 1980 Summer Olympics in Moscow, because of its partial support of the US-led boycott.

The National Olympic Committee of Thailand fielded a team of 54 athletes, 26 men and 28 women, to compete in fifteen sports at the Games. It was the nation's joint-largest ever delegation sent to the Olympics, alongside the team sent to the Tokyo Games in 1964. Thailand made its Olympic debut in women's boxing, BMX cycling, golf, and men's table tennis. Moreover, it registered more female athletes than males for only the second time in history.

Fourteen athletes on the Thai roster competed at London 2012, including badminton star Boonsak Ponsana (men's singles) and table tennis player Nanthana Komwong, both of whom made their historic fifth Olympic appearance as the most experienced competitors on the team. Apart from the veterans, four more Thai athletes made their third Olympic appearance, namely welterweight boxer Sailom Adi, freestyle swimmer Natthanan Junkrajang, pistol shooter Tanyaporn Prucksakorn, and world's top-ranked skeet shooter Sutiya Jiewchaloemmit. Other notable Thai athletes included professional golfer Ariya Jutanugarn, who became the first Thai golfer capture the major championship title, and world's top four badminton player Ratchanok Intanon (women's singles), who was named as the country's first female flag bearer for the opening ceremony.

Thailand left Rio de Janeiro with a total of six medals (two for each color), its most successful Olympics since 2004. Four of these medals were awarded to the team in weightlifting, including two golds won by Sopita Tanasan (women's 48 kg) and Sukanya Srisurat (women's 58 kg), and two others in taekwondo. For the first time in four decades, Thailand failed to pick up a single medal in boxing, as neither of its fighters progressed beyond the quarterfinal round.

Medalists

| width=78% align=left valign=top |

| width=22% align=left valign=top |

Competitors

Archery

One Thai archer qualified for the men's individual recurve at the Olympics by virtue of a top five national finish at the 2016 Archery World Cup meet in Antalya, Turkey.

Athletics
 
Thai athletes have so far achieved qualifying standards in the following athletics events (up to a maximum of 3 athletes in each event):

Track & road events

Field events

Badminton

Thailand has qualified a total of seven badminton players for each of the following events into the Olympic tournament based on the BWF World Rankings as of 5 May 2016: two entries in the women's singles, one in the men's singles, and a pair each in the women's and mixed doubles.

Men

Women

Mixed

Boxing

Thailand has entered four boxers to compete in the Olympic boxing tournament. Wuttichai Masuk became the first Thai boxer to be selected to the Olympic team, following his box-off victory at the 2015 World Championships. Meanwhile, 2012 Olympians Chatchai Butdee and Sailom Adi had claimed their Olympic spots at the 2016 Asia & Oceania Qualification Tournament in Qian'an, China.

Peamwilai Laopeam was the only Thai woman to book an Olympic spot, with a quarterfinal victory at the World Championships in Astana, Kazakhstan. Lightweight boxer Amnat Ruenroeng rounded out the Thai roster by his performance at the 2016 APB and WSB Olympic Qualifier in Vargas, Venezuela.

Cycling

Road
Thailand has qualified one rider in the women's Olympic road race by virtue of a top 100 individual placement in the 2016 UCI World Rankings.

BMX
Thailand has receive an invitation from the UCI to send a women's BMX rider to the Olympics, as the next highest-ranked eligible nation, not yet qualified, in the UCI Olympic Ranking List of May 31, 2016. BMX rider and Asian Games champion Amanda Carr was named to the Thai team on June 1, 2016.

Golf 

Thailand has entered four golfers (two per gender) into the Olympic tournament. Kiradech Aphibarnrat (world no. 53), Thongchai Jaidee (world no. 38), Ariya Jutanugarn (world no. 7) and Pornanong Phatlum (world no. 34) qualified directly among the top 60 eligible players for their respective individual events based on the IGF World Rankings as of 11 July 2016.

Judo

Thailand has qualified one judoka for the men's heavyweight category (+100 kg) at the Games. Kunathip Yea-on earned a continental quota spot from the Asian region, as the highest-ranked Thai judoka outside of direct qualifying position in the IJF World Ranking List of May 30, 2016.

Rowing

Thailand has qualified one boat each in the men's and women's single sculls at the 2016 Asia & Oceania Continental Qualification Regatta in Chungju, South Korea.

Qualification Legend: FA=Final A (medal); FB=Final B (non-medal); FC=Final C (non-medal); FD=Final D (non-medal); FE=Final E (non-medal); FF=Final F (non-medal); SA/B=Semifinals A/B; SC/D=Semifinals C/D; SE/F=Semifinals E/F; QF=Quarterfinals; R=Repechage

Sailing
 
Thai sailors have qualified one boat in each of the following classes through the individual fleet World Championships, and the Asian Sailing Championships.

M = Medal race; EL = Eliminated – did not advance into the medal race

Shooting
 
Thai shooters have achieved quota places for the following events by virtue of their best finishes at the 2015 ISSF World Cup series, and Asian Championships, as long as they obtained a minimum qualifying score (MQS) as of March 31, 2016.

Qualification Legend: Q = Qualify for the next round; q = Qualify for the bronze medal (shotgun)

Swimming

Thailand has received a Universality invitation from FINA to send two swimmers (one male and one female) to the Olympics.

Table tennis

Thailand has entered three athletes into the table tennis competition at the Games. Suthasini Sawettabut and incoming five-time Olympian Nanthana Komwong scored a second-stage victory each to book two out of six remaining Olympic spots in the women's singles at the Asian Qualification Tournament in Hong Kong. Meanwhile, Padasak Tanviriyavechakul received an unused Olympic spot in the men's singles as the next highest-ranked player, after Hong Kong made its decision to decline a berth in the same tournament.

Taekwondo
 
Panipak Wongpattanakit qualified automatically for the women's flyweight category (49 kg) by finishing in the top 6 WTF Olympic rankings. Meanwhile, Tawin Hanprab and Phannapa Harnsujin secured the remaining spots on the Thai team by virtue of their top two finish in the men's flyweight (58 kg) and women's lightweight category (57 kg), respectively, at the 2016 Asian Qualification Tournament in Manila, Philippines.

Tennis

Thailand has entered two tennis players into the Olympic tournament, signifying the nation's return to the sport after an eight-year hiatus. Due to the withdrawal of several tennis players from the Games, twin brothers Sanchai and Sonchat Ratiwatana received a spare ITF Olympic place to compete in the men's doubles.

Weightlifting

Thai weightlifters have qualified five men's and four women's quota places for the Rio Olympics based on their combined team standing by points at the 2014 and 2015 IWF World Championships. The team must allocate these places to individual athletes by June 20, 2016.

The full weightlifting team, headlined by London 2012 silver medalist Pimsiri Sirikaew, was named to the Thai roster on July 18, 2016.

Men

Women

See also
Thailand at the 2016 Summer Paralympics

References

External links 

 

Olympics
Nations at the 2016 Summer Olympics
2016